Alessandro Deti or Alessandro Deto (died January, 1637) was a Roman Catholic prelate who served as Bishop of Anglona-Tursi (1632–1637).

Biography
On 26 April 1632, Alessandro Deti was appointed during the papacy of Pope Urban VIII as Bishop of Anglona-Tursi. On 9 May 1632, he was consecrated bishop by Giulio Cesare Sacchetti, Bishop of Fano, with Angelo Cesi, Bishop of Rimini, and Giovanni Battista Scanaroli, Titular Bishop of Sidon. serving as co-consecrators. He served as Bishop of Anglona-Tursi until his death in January 1637. While bishop, he was the principal co-consecrator of Pietro Niccolini, Archbishop of Florence (1632).

References

External links and additional sources
 (for Chronology of Bishops) 
 (for Chronology of Bishops) 

17th-century Italian Roman Catholic bishops
Bishops appointed by Pope Urban VIII
1637 deaths